Carpanzano is a town and comune in the province of Cosenza in the Calabria region of southern Italy.

See also
 Savuto river

References

Cities and towns in Calabria